Nick Twisk (born 13 March 2003) is a Dutch professional footballer who plays as a midfielder for Dutch club AZ Alkmaar.

Career
He played a key part as the AZ under-18 side won a league and cup double in the 2021-22 season. 
Twisk made his professional league debut for Jong AZ in the Eerste Divisie on April 30 2021, in the 0-1 away match against Roda JC Kerkrade. Twisk was rewarded with a new contract in April 2022, designed to keep him at AZ until the summer of 2024.

References

2003 births
Living people
Eerste Divisie players
Jong AZ players
Dutch footballers
Association football midfielders